Yada'a is a sub-district located in the Al Haymah Al Kharijiyah District, Sana'a Governorate, Yemen. Yada'a had a population of 1998 according to the 2004 census.

References 

Sub-districts in Al Haymah Al Kharijiyah District